Kherigonpa  is a village in south-eastern Bhutan. It is located in Pemagatshel District.

At the 2005 census, its population was 141.

References 

Populated places in Bhutan